Ancylolomia westwoodi, the Westwood's grass-moth, is a moth in the family Crambidae. It was described by Zeller in 1863. It is found in Afghanistan, Iran, western Pakistan, India, Sri Lanka, Sulawesi, Java, Bali, Malaysia, Sumatra and Australia, where it has been recorded from the Northern Territory and Queensland. It is externally indistinguishable from Ancylolomia indica, but generally darker. A.w.bitubirosella is one of the most common Crambinae in India. 

The wingspan is about 20 mm. The forewings are covered in brown stripes, sometimes silvery and pale pink-yellow in A.w.bitubirosella. The lower forewings can vary from yellow or brown to silvery. The hindwings are white in the nominate subspecies, pale brown in A.w.bitubirosella. Ancylolomia westwoodi bitubirosella is sometimes considered a distinct species, Ancylolomia bitubirosella, the Indian dark grass-moth.

Subspecies
Ancylolomia westwoodi westwoodi (Australia)
Ancylolomia westwoodi bitubirosella Amsel, 1959 (Afghanistan, Iran, western Pakistan, India, Sri Lanka, Sulawesi, Java, Bali, Malaysia, Sumatra)

References

Ancylolomia
Moths described in 1863
Moths of Asia
Moths of Australia